Dan Kyle is an Australian artist and the recipient of the Brett Whiteley Travelling Art Scholarship 2020. He graduated with a Bachelor of Fine Arts from the National Art School in Darlinghurst in 2010. He lives in Kurrajong Heights at the foot of the Blue Mountains in New South Wales and much of his painting reflects the changing landscape there. His paintings are held in the Collection of the Australian Catholic University and in many private collections in Australia.

Exhibits 
Backcountry at the Nicholas Thompson Gallery 2019

Caught in the Haze at the Edwina Corlette Gallery 2019

Recognition 
In 2020, Kyle won the Brett Whiteley Travelling Art Scholarship. He was twice a Finalist of the Paddington Art Prize (2015, 2012 – Highly Commended). He was a finalist for the Mosman Art Prize in 2013 and again in 2019. In 2010 he was the winner of the Walcha Show and the Inner City Clay Workers Award, NAS, Sydney.

References 

21st-century Australian artists
Living people
Year of birth missing (living people)